Saint Leibowitz is a character in the science fiction novels A Canticle for Leibowitz and Saint Leibowitz and the Wild Horse Woman written by Walter M. Miller, Jr.

Background
Isaac Edward Leibowitz is married to a woman named Emily.  He lives during a nuclear war in the United States, referred to as “the Flame Deluge.” Leibowitz is a technician and drafts a blueprint for a transistorized control system.  The blueprint is replicated centuries later by Brother Francis Gerard of Utah, a monk.  
Leibowitz is a hero to the monks. A statue of Leibowitz stands in the monastery which is named after him in his honor. The monks refer to him as Beatus ('Blessed') Leibowitz prior to the canticle ceremony, and he is called 'Saint Leibowitz' after it (Brians 2007, 3).

Plot
After the death of his wife Emily, readers can infer that Leibowitz takes vows to become a priest, and that he establishes a religious community dedicated to preserving history for generations to come. They smuggle books for preservation and act as "memorizers" who remember the books in case the books are destroyed.  This religious community feels it important, and indeed, its calling, to preserve scientific documents, from blueprints to texts, so that humankind in the future will be able to educate itself about their heritage. The world is going through a simplification. All knowledge, especially written words, is deemed evil. He is considered a martyr, caught and strangled while smuggling books. The mob destroys documents and books hidden in kegs so only a few books and documents remain.

Saint Isaac Edward Leibowitz is a pioneer archivist. He is revered, especially by the monks.  Centuries after his death, other monks continue the work of preserving written documents. Saint Leibowitz's foresight prevents future generations from being deprived of their heritage, but ...

Usage in other publications
 In James A. Michener's novel Space, the last words by Colonel Randy Claggett (commander of Apollo 18) before the lunar module Luna crashes: "Blessed Saint Leibowitz, keep 'em dreamin' down there".
 In Wasteland 2 video game, there is a religious engineer at Leve L'Upe mine, with this name, a reference to Saint Leibowitz of A Canticle for Leibowitz.

References
Miller, Walter M., Jr. 1959. A Canticle for Leibowitz. New York: Bantam Books.

External sources
Brians, Paul. Study guide for Walter M. Miller, Jr.: a canticle for Leibowitz (1959). https://web.archive.org/web/20080325034410/http://www.wsu.edu/~brians/science_fiction/canticle.html (accessed March 14, 2008).

Characters in written science fiction
Literary characters introduced in 1959
Characters in American novels of the 20th century
Fictional Christian saints
Catholicism in fiction
Historical preservationists